My Heidelberg, I Can Not Forget You (German: Mein Heidelberg, ich kann Dich nicht vergessen) is a 1927 German silent film directed by James Bauer and starring Dorothea Wieck, and Hans Adalbert Schlettow.

It was shot at the Emelka Studios in Munich.

Cast
 Dorothea Wieck as Klärchen Schröder 
 Hans Adalbert Schlettow as Fritz Hansen, Reedereibesitzer 
 Vivian Gibson as Mia, seine Geliebte 
 Karl Platen as Georg Schröder, der Vater 
 Harry Halm   
 Sylvester Bauriedl as Alex Winckler, cand. jur. 
 Emil Höfer as Pastor Schönhoff 
 Gertrud de Lalsky as Sophie, seine Frau 
 Georg Irmer as Erstchargierter Merkelbach 
 Carla Färber as Trude, Klärchen Freundin

References

Bibliography
 Bock, Hans-Michael & Bergfelder, Tim. The Concise CineGraph. Encyclopedia of German Cinema. Berghahn Books, 2009.

External links

1927 films
Films of the Weimar Republic
German silent feature films
Films directed by James Bauer
Films set in Heidelberg
Bavaria Film films
Films shot at Bavaria Studios
Films scored by Fred Raymond
German black-and-white films